"Solo Dancing" is a song by British singer-songwriter Indiana. The song was released in the United Kingdom on 18 April 2014 as a digital download from her debut studio album No Romeo (2015). The song peaked at number 14 on the UK Singles Chart and number 85 on the Irish Singles Chart.

Music video
A music video to accompany the release of "Solo Dancing" was first released onto YouTube on 17 February 2014 at a total length of three minutes and thirty-four seconds. As of October 2016, the music video has over 2 million views on Youtube, making it her most viewed video.

Track listing

Chart performance
On 23 April 2014 the song was at number 9 on The Official Chart Update in the UK. On 24 April 2014 the song entered the Irish Singles Chart at number 93, peaking to number 85. On 27 April 2014 the song entered the UK Singles Chart at number 14.

Charts

Release history

References

2014 singles
Indiana (singer) songs
2014 songs
Sony Music singles
Songs written by John Beck (songwriter)
Songs written by Steve Chrisanthou